Stavešinski Vrh (in older sources also Stavenski Vrh) is a settlement north of Stavešinci in the Municipality of Gornja Radgona in northeastern Slovenia.

There is a small chapel-shine in the central part of the village. It was built in 1814.

References

External links
Stavešinski Vrh on Geopedia

Populated places in the Municipality of Gornja Radgona